Zahir Facundo Mansilla (born 27 February 1999) is an Argentine professional footballer who plays as a defender for Argentine Primera División club Newell's Old Boys.

Career
Born in Rosario, Mansilla joined the Newell's Old Boys youth set-up in 2013. He made his first-team debut on 17 May 2021 against Sarmiento in the Copa Argentina. He made his league debut in a 3–2 win over Talleres de Córdoba on 17 July 2021. On 4 September 2021, it was announced that Mansilla had signed a new contract with the club until December 2023, and he scored the first goal of his career later that day with a volley in a 1–1 draw against Colón.

References

External links

1999 births
Living people
Argentine footballers
Footballers from Rosario, Santa Fe
Association football defenders
Newell's Old Boys footballers
Argentine Primera División players